Moonville is an unincorporated community in Richland Township, Madison County, Indiana.

Geography

History
Moonville was laid out in 1835 by Zimri Moon, and named for him.

References

Links
 Madison County Cemeteries Commission

Unincorporated communities in Madison County, Indiana
Unincorporated communities in Indiana
Indianapolis metropolitan area